Kola Modupe Adams (Chinese: 阿达姆斯; born 18 November 1980 in Nigeria) is a Nigerian retired footballer.

Career

After playing for French club Clermont Foot, Adams signed for Shanghai SIPG in the Chinese top flight, where he stayed for a few seasons.

For 2005/06, he returned to France with AS Moulins before playing for Moulins Yzeure Foot, Feignies Aulnoye, Nevers 58, and Souvigny in the French lower leagues.

In 2003, Adams made his solitary appearance for the Nigeria national team, in a 3-0 friendly loss to Japan.

External links
 Kola Adams at National Football Teams

Nigerian footballers
Living people
Association football defenders
Nigeria international footballers
1980 births